The title Hero of the Mongolian People's Republic was the highest distinction in the Mongolian People's Republic (MPR). It was modeled on the Soviet Union's highest award, the Hero of the Soviet Union title.

History 
Soon after the victory of the Mongolian Revolution of 1921, the new government formed high degrees of distinction, which was appropriated by the Provisional People's Government . The first such title was the title of "Fearless Hero of the Mongolian People's State", which was awarded on September 23, 1922 to Damdin Sükhbaatar. On April 24, 1924, the title of "Unyielding People's Hero" was awarded to his colleague Khatanbaatar Magsarjav Two more Mongolian servicemen were awarded this title for heroism in battles on the border with Manchuria in 1936. In 1945, a special insignia was introduced for those awarded the title of Hero of the Mongolian People's Republic: the Gold Star of the Hero of the MPR.

Notable Recipients

Mongolian

 Damdin Sükhbaatar – Minister of War of Mongolia
 Khatanbaatar Magsarjav – Former Prime Minister of Mongolia
 Khorloogiin Choibalsan – Marshal of the Mongolian People's Republic
 Yumjaagiin Tsedenbal – Chairman of the Presidium of the People's Great Khural
 Batyn Dorj – Minister of Defense of the Mongolian People's Republic
 Butochiyn Tsog – Mongolian general
 Jügderdemidiin Gürragchaa – Mongolian Cosmonaut
 Bagziin Givaan – Veteran of Border Guards who took part in the Battle of Baitag Bogd.

Foreign

 Joseph Stalin – Leader of the Soviet Union
 Kliment Voroshilov – Chairman of the Supreme Soviet of the USSR
 Gherman Titov – Soviet Cosmonaut
 Andriyan Nikolayev – Soviet Cosmonaut
 Pavel Belyayev – Soviet Cosmonaut
 Georgy Zhukov – Marshal of the Soviet Union
 Ivan Konev – Marshal of the Soviet Union
 Issa Pliyev – General of the Army (Soviet Union)
 Leonid Brezhnev – General Secretary of the Communist Party of the Soviet Union
 Alexei Kosygin – Prime Minister of the Soviet Union
 Dmitry Ustinov – Minister of Defense of the Soviet Union

References

Links 

 «Золотая Звезда Героя МНР» на сайте Награды Монголии

Orders, decorations, and medals of Mongolia
Mongolian People's Republic
Awards established in 1922
Hero (title)